After the Rain is the eighteenth studio album by Irma Thomas. After the Rain won Best Contemporary Blues Album at the 49th Annual Grammy Awards, the first Grammy Award for Thomas, and the second-ever Grammy win by a woman in this category, after Etta James.

The album was recorded at the Dockside Studios in Maurice, Louisiana, only months after Hurricane Katrina destroyed Thomas' home in New Orleans.

Track listing

Personnel
 Juanita Brooks - background vocals
 Marc Broussard - background vocals
 David Egan - piano
 Charles "Chucky C" Elam, III - background vocals
 Corey Harris - acoustic guitar, electric guitar 
 Sonny Landreth - slide guitar
 Stanton Moore - drums, percussion
 Dirk Powell - fiddle, fretless banjo, acoustic guitar, electric guitar
 James Singleton - acoustic bass
 David Torkanowsky - Hammond B3 organ, piano
 Irma Thomas - vocals

References

2006 albums
Rounder Records albums